The 2017–18 season was AaB's 35th consecutive season in the top flight of Danish football, 28th consecutive season in the Danish Superliga, and 132nd year in existence as a football club.

Club

Coaching staff 

{| class="wikitable"
!Position
!Staff
|-
|Head coach|| Morten Wieghorst 
|-
|Assistant coaches|| Jacob Friis Thomas Augustinussen
|-
|Development manager|| Poul Erik Andreasen
|-
|Goalkeeping coach|| Poul Buus
|-
|Team Leader|| Ernst Damborg
|-
|Doctor|| Søren Kaalund
|-
|Physiotherapist|| Morten Skjoldager
|-
|Physical trainer|| Ashley Tootle
|-
|Sports psychology consultant|| Martin Langagergaard
|-
|U/19 League coach|| Lasse Stensgaard
|-
|U/17 League coach|| Adam Harell
|-

Other information 

|-

Squad

First team squad 
This squad list includes any first team squad player who was available for the line-up during the season.

Source: AaB Fodbold website

Youth players in use 

This list includes any youth player from AaB Academy who was used in the season.

Transfers and loans

In

Summer

Winter

Out

Summer

Winter

Loan in

Loan out

Friendlies

Pre-season

Mid-season

Competitions

Competition record

Alka Superliga

Results summary

Regular season

Matches

Championship round

Matches

DBU Pokalen

Statistics

Appearances 

This includes all competitive matches. The list is sorted by shirt number when appearances are equal.

Goalscorers 

This includes all competitive matches. The list is sorted by shirt number when total goals are equal.

Clean sheets 

This includes all competitive matches. The list is sorted by shirt number when total clean sheets are equal.

Disciplinary record 

This includes all competitive matches. The list is sorted by shirt number when total cards are equal.

Suspensions 

This includes all competitive matches. The list is sorted by shirt number when total matches suspended are equal.

Awards

Team

Individual

References 

2017-18
Danish football clubs 2017–18 season